Liancourt is a commune in the Saint-Marc Arrondissement, in the Artibonite department of Haiti. Once a communal section, a presidential decree on 22 July 2015 made it a commune.

References

Populated places in Artibonite (department)
Communes of Haiti